The men's long jump was one of four men's jumping events on the Athletics at the 1964 Summer Olympics program in Tokyo. It was held on 18 October 1964. 37 athletes from 23 nations entered, with 5 not starting in the qualification round. The maximum number of athletes per nation had been set at 3 since the 1930 Olympic Congress. The event was won by Lynn Davies of Great Britain, breaking a string of eight straight American victories. It was Great Britain's first gold medal in the men's long jump, and first medal since 1900. It was only the second time the United States had not won the event, with Sweden's William Petersson in 1920 the only non-American to win before Davies. Ralph Boston of the United States and Igor Ter-Ovanesyan of the Soviet Union became the third and fourth men to win a second medal in the long jump (Boston had won gold and Ter-Ovanesyan bronze in 1960).

Background

This was the 15th appearance of the event, which is one of 12 athletics events to have been held at every Summer Olympics. The returning finalists from the 1960 Games were defending champion Ralph Boston of the United States, bronze medalist Igor Ter-Ovanesyan of the Soviet Union, eleventh-place finisher Dimos Manglaras of Greece, and thirteenth-place finisher Fred Alsop of Great Britain. The event was expected to be a battle between Boston and Ter-Ovanesyan; since the 1960 Games, Boston had broken his own world record twice, Ter-Ovanesyan had broken Boston's new world record, and then Boston had first tied and then broken Ter-Ovanesyan's new world record.

Ghana, Hong Kong, Jamaica, and Puerto Rico each made their first appearance in the event. The United States appeared for the 15th time, the only nation to have long jumpers at each of the Games thus far.

Competition format

The 1964 competition used the two-round format with divided final introduced in 1952. The qualifying round gave each competitor three jumps to achieve a distance of 7.60 metres; if fewer than 12 men did so, the top 12 (including all those tied) would advance. The final provided each jumper with three jumps; the top six jumpers received an additional three jumps for a total of six, with the best to count (qualifying round jumps were not considered for the final).

Records

Prior to this competition, the existing world and Olympic records were as follows.

No new world or Olympic records were set during the competition.

Schedule

All times are Japan Standard Time (UTC+9)

Results

Qualifying

The qualification standard was 7.60 metres with a minimum of 12 jumpers advancing. Each jumper had three opportunities. Since only 5 jumpers met the standard, the next 7 longest jumpers also advanced.

Final

For the final, the qualification marks were ignored and each jumper received three jumps. The six jumpers with the best marks in the final were awarded three more attempts, and their best mark from all six of the final jumps was considered.

References

Athletics at the 1964 Summer Olympics
Long jump at the Olympics
Men's events at the 1964 Summer Olympics